Pauls Stradiņš Clinical University Hospital is an outpatient and hospital health care service provider in Riga, Latvia. This hospital also plays a role in medical science and medical education. It aims to become a science and a training center to residents and prospective doctors and currently is affiliated with two universities (University of Latvia and Riga Stradiņš University). It is named after Pauls Stradiņš.

History 
Latvia's largest and most important hospital has changed its name eight times since 1910. It was called 2nd Riga City Hospital from 1910 until 1940, and has been the main teaching hospital of the University of Latvia since 1928. During the Soviet occupation in 1940–1941, it was called the National Clinical Hospital, and then during the German occupation until 1944 it was called Riga Hospital. From 1944 until 1948, it was called the National Clinical Hospital, then renamed the Republican Clinical Hospital until 1958 when the name was again changed to Pauls Stradiņš Republican Clinical Hospital. In 1993, the name was again changed to Pauls Stradiņš National Hospital, and in 1995 the name was changed to the Latvian Academy of Medicine Pauls Stradiņš Clinical Hospital. Finally it got its present name – Pauls Stradiņš Clinical University Hospital. However, since 1958 residents of Riga in daily life refer to the hospital by one simple word – Stradiņa.

2013 explosions 
On 2 August 2013 at around 09:21 several oxygen gas cylinders exploded in the basement of the cardiology wing's 32nd block, injuring two people. The explosions started a fire, which caused at least 10 more gas cylinders to explode. After the initial explosions an evacuation of the cardiology wing began, which resulted in the evacuation of 170 people. Whilst some patients were allowed to go home and return on Monday (August 5), others were evacuated to other hospitals like Gaiļezers. According to eyewitnesses, the fire had spread very quickly; nevertheless firefighters succeeded in localizing the blaze within an hour. The first call that firefighters received was at 09:31, after which 15 firefighting trucks were dispatched to the hospital. Of the 60 oxygen gas cylinders that were in the basement storage, 23 exploded.

Expansion 
The hospital opened the first section of a new wing in 2017. Block A stage one was constructed at a cost of €74,890,870, with €24,076,323 provided by the European Regional Development Fund. The second stage of construction is planned to be completed by 2023.

Notes and references 

Hospitals in Latvia
Universities and colleges in Latvia
Hospitals established in 1910
1910 establishments in Europe
University of Latvia
Buildings and structures in Riga
Hospitals built in the Soviet Union